The Seven Deadly Sins (Nanatsu no Taizai / 七つの大罪) is a Japanese manga series written and illustrated by Nakaba Suzuki. The series follows Elizabeth, the third princess of the Kingdom of Liones, who is in search of the Seven Deadly Sins, a group of former Holy Knights who were disbanded after the kingdom was overthrown. She enlists the help of Meliodas and Hawk, the leader of the Seven Deadly Sins and the leader of the order of scraps disposal, to assemble the remaining members of the Seven Deadly Sins and take back the kingdom from the Holy Knights. The series aired on MBS, TBS and their JNN stations from October 5, 2014 to March 29, 2015. A second season of the anime series was confirmed on September 27, 2015, and aired from January 13 to June 30, 2018. A third season of the anime series by Studio Deen was confirmed on April 9, 2019, and aired from October 9, 2019 to March 25, 2020. A fourth season of the anime series was confirmed on March 24, 2020. Originally slated for a October 2020 debut, it was postponed to premiere on January 13, 2021 due to the COVID-19 pandemic.

An original video animation (OVA) titled  was included with the limited edition of volume 15 of the manga, released on June 17, 2015. A second OVA composed of nine humorous shorts was shipped with the limited edition of the sixteenth volume of the manga, released on August 12, 2015.

The first Seven Deadly Sins anime series was licensed for English release by Netflix as its second exclusive anime, following their acquisition of Knights of Sidonia. All 24 episodes were released on November 1, 2015 in both subtitled and English dub formats. All four specials from the series' Signs of Holy War arc, labeled as Season 2, was added to the service on February 17, 2017. The Revival of the Commandments arc, labeled as Season 3, was released on October 15, 2018 in the United States. The Imperial Wrath of the Gods arc, labeled as Season 4, was released on August 6, 2020 in the USA.

Series overview

Episode list

The Seven Deadly Sins

The Seven Deadly Sins: Signs of Holy War

The Seven Deadly Sins: Revival of The Commandments

The Seven Deadly Sins: Wrath of the Gods

The Seven Deadly Sins: Dragon's Judgement

References

External links
Official page at Weekly Shōnen Magazine
Official anime website
Official video game website

Lists of anime episodes
The Seven Deadly Sins seasons